Jamestown is a village on the banks of the River Shannon in the south of County Leitrim, Ireland. It lies some 5 km east-south-east of the county town, Carrick-on-Shannon. It was named after King James VI & I.

Jamestown was built as a walled town during the Plantation of Leitrim for early to mid-seventeenth-century English settlers alongside the earlier settlement of Cill Srianáin, which had included an abbey. It used to be on the main Sligo to Dublin road (N4) and was known for the narrow pillars of the arch of the old town gate that straddles the road in the centre of the village. The arch was damaged by a passing lorry in the early 1970s and the top was removed. In recent years at Christmas, a lighted skeletal arch has been erected by the local community.

Two pubs and a church mark the centre of the village, close to the remains of the boundary walls. 
Jamestown lies beside the Shannon with its own quay and is a popular stopping point for boats. Navigation for cruisers is not possible downstream of Jamestown, boats being required to use the Jamestown Canal and Albert Lock, which links to the Shannon south of Drumsna

History

The Plantation settlement was created by Royal Charter from King James VI & I in 1621 and was founded in 1622 as a plantation town carrying into action the decision of 1620 to plant County Leitrim with loyal English settlers. It had an area of  under its liberty.

A stone cross over a small gate (constructed by Murtagh O'Dowd, local blacksmith), outside the old town gate, leads to the remains of a Franciscan friary of the Friars Minor. The Franciscan friary of the Friars Minor was not founded until the occupation of Jamestown in 1642 by the O'Rourke Clan. A synod held here in 1650 repudiated The 1st Marquess of Ormonde, the former Lord Lieutenant of Ireland, and excommunicated his followers. In 1713, an elderly Father Connor Reynolds "of Jamestown in the county of Leitrim" exiled in Spain since 1681, was captured hiding in a trunk on a fishing boat arriving at Dungarvan port and imprisoned at Waterford gaol.

The Borough with a very restricted franchise returned two members to the Irish Parliament until the Act of Union with Britain in 1801. Among its parliamentary representatives were Sir Charles Coote (1634–1660), John Fitzgibbon (1776; he was later elevated to the peerage in 1789, eventually becoming Earl of Clare in 1795), and Richard Martin, "Humanity Dick".  The surnames Butler and Clyne are particularly numerous in the Jamestown area.

Throughout at least the nineteenth century and for much of the twentieth century, a number of annual fairs were held at Jamestown on- 28 May, 8 July, 1 September, and 20 December. In 1925, Jamestown village comprised 15 houses, 4 being licensed to sell alcohol.

River crossings
Both Jamestown and Drumsna have long been important fording places across the Shannon. The present stone bridges were built during the 19th century as part of improvements to the Shannon navigation. The main Dublin - Sligo road ran across these until a bypass was completed in the late 1990s.

Doon of Drumsna
The Dún (Doon) of Drumsna, an Iron Age fortification built as a crossing point into Connacht, lies opposite the quay and runs across the Shannon peninsula between Jamestown and Drumsna. It was one of many linear earthworks built across the country around that time. The main rampart was massive with parts still standing up to 6 metres high and 30 metres across at the base. Additional banks were built on either side of the main rampart which extends for 1.6 kilometres. Two main entrances were built as pincer or Zangentor defensive works.

In addition to the main rampart, a secondary rampart extends upstream along the western river bank where shallows existed.

See also
 List of towns and villages in Ireland

References

Notes

Sources

Towns and villages in County Leitrim
Populated places on the River Shannon
Populated places established in 1622